This article provides a list of albums recorded by alumni of the popular American televised singing competition American Idol in the post-Idol career. It only lists main albums released in the alumni's post-Idol career. American Idol compilations, individual artist's pre-Idol recordings, EPs, and compilation albums are not listed here, however, the numbers in parentheses may include sales from these releases. For complete list of releases including those not listed here for each artist, please see their individual discography pages (linked here in the total number in parentheses). Sales figure listed are for U.S. only.

Artists with sales of 500,000 or more albums
This first list only includes contestants with at least 500,000 total album sales. Total albums sold listed in this pages for each artist is shown first. Certification status of album for units shipped in U.S.  (Gold, Platinum, and/or Multi-platinum) is shown if awarded. The numbers in parentheses are for sales for all albums including EPs and compilations which may not be listed here.

 Aiken's album, Tried & True was re-packaged and re-released by Decca under the new name, Steadfast, concurrent with his appearance on The Celebrity Apprentice in 2012

Artists with sales of less than 500,000 albums
The following is a list of other American Idol alumni album sales and reflects that commercial success can be achieved through association with American Idol and with post-Idol promotion, although the degree of success varies considerably. This list only includes contestants who have numbers available, and again does not include EPs, American Idol compilations, or pre-Idol recordings, numbers in parentheses however may include sales from these releases:

References

External links 
 Idol chatter

Album sales
American Idol